Sister & Brother is the full-length debut by Melky Sedeck, released in 1999. It mixes a variety of genres, including hip-hop, reggae, soul, and gospel.

The album was initially titled Da Joint.

Critical reception
The Los Angeles Times wrote that "Melky’s plush, earthy voice simultaneously conveys attitude, passion and coolness, getting to your heart through deep emotion, not high drama." Robert Christgau wrote that "conscious siblings though they may be, they do sex best," and praised "Shake It" and "Attraction". The New Yorker listed the album as one of 1999's twelve best, calling it "a bright, celestial soundscape." The New York Times wrote that "this fine set of grooves deserves attention, most of all for Ms. [Melky] Jean's vociferous talent.

Track listing
"Shake It" (featuring Supreme C) – 4:18
"Foolish Heart" – 4:14
"To Sir With Love" – 3:40
"Lady" (featuring Darryl Pearson) – 4:18
"Mi Amor" – 3:37
"Raw" – 5:51
"In Time" – 4:01
"#1 Guy" – 4:07
"Attraction" – 4:00
"High Heel Shoes" – 2:45
"Diva" – 3:16
"Paradise" – 4:31

References

External links
FFWD Weekly

1999 debut albums
Melky Sedeck albums